The deputy secretary of veterans affairs, in the United States government, is the chief operating officer of the United States Department of Veterans Affairs, responsible for a nationwide system of health care services, benefits programs, and national cemeteries for America's veterans and their dependents.
The deputy secretary is the second-highest-ranking officer in the Department and succeeds the secretary of veterans affairs in the event of his resignation, death, or otherwise inability to fulfill his duties.

The deputy secretary of veterans affairs is appointed by the President and confirmed by the Senate. The position was created with the creation of the Department of Veterans Affairs in October 1988.

Donald Remy is the current deputy secretary of veterans affairs since July 19, 2021.

List of deputy secretaries of veterans affairs

References
Acted as Secretary during their tenure. See the list of Secretaries for dates.

Veterans Affairs